Prudhomat is a commune in the Lot department in south-western France.

The Château de Castelnau-Bretenoux is located in Prudhomat.

See also
Communes of the Lot department

References

Communes of Lot (department)